Never Know is a 2021 single by Bad Omens.

Never Know may also refer to:

 "Never Know", a song by Dhani Harrison from In Parallel, 2017
 "Never Know", a song by Jack Johnson from In Between Dreams, 2005
 "Never Know", a song by Why Don't We, 2017
 "Never Know", a song by Luciano from Exot, 2020
 "Never Know", a song by Nav from Bad Habits, 2019

See also
 You Never Know (disambiguation)
 You'll Never Know (disambiguation)